Structural capital  is one of the three primary components of intellectual capital, and consists of the supportive infrastructure, processes, and databases of the organisation that enable human capital to function. Structural capital is owned by an organization and remains with an organization even when people leave. It includes: capabilities, routines, methods, procedures and methodologies embedded in organisation.

Structural capital is the supportive non-physical infrastructure that enables human capital to function.

There are three subcomponents that comprise structural capital:
 
Organizational capital includes the organization philosophy and systems for leveraging the organization’s capability.

Process capital includes the techniques, procedures, and programs that implement and enhance the delivery of goods and services.

Innovation capital includes intellectual property and certain other intangible assets. Intellectual property includes protected commercial rights such as patents, copyrights and trademarks. Intangible assets are all of the other talents and theory by which an organization is run.

See also 
Intellectual capital
Intellectual capital management
Human capital
Relational capital
Organizational capital

References

External links
 National intangible capital NIC 2016 database / Findings and results for structural (process) capital 2001 - 2016
 National intellectual capital NIC as economic driver 2001-2011 / Findings and results for structural (process) capital

Capital (economics)
Management cybernetics